Geoff Jones (5 April 1930 – 15 February 2018) was an Australian rules footballer who played for the St Kilda Football Club in the Victorian Football League (VFL).

Notes

External links 

1930 births
2018 deaths
Australian rules footballers from Victoria (Australia)
St Kilda Football Club players
Sandringham Football Club players